La Motte-Picquet was a F70 type anti-submarine frigate of the French Navy. She was the fourth French vessel named after the 18th Century admiral count Toussaint-Guillaume Picquet de la Motte.  she was serving in the Persian Gulf. The ship was decommissioned in October 2020.

Service history
On 22 August 2007, she took custody of the Danish freighter  which had been captured by pirates on 3 June.

2011/12 tour 
She left Brest on 9 November 2011 for active duty in the Indian Ocean and was refuelled by the US replenishment ship  on 10 January 2012. On 22 January she passed through the Straits of Hormuz with the British frigate  and a US battlegroup centred on the aircraft carrier .

Opération Chammal

In November 2015, a French Navy press release stated that La Motte-Picquet will be part of the  task force launching strikes against the Islamic State of Iraq and the Levant starting January 2016.

Tracking Russian warships

British-French CJEF
In April 2016, La Motte-Picquet was part of the Anglo-French CJEF exercise.

Gallery

References 

 Frégate La Motte-Picquet on netmarine.net

External links

Georges Leygues-class frigates
Frigates of France
1985 ships
Ships built in France